The Healers is a novel by Ayi Kwei Armah. It was Armah's fifth novel which was published in 1979.

References 

1978 Ghanaian novels